Daniel Ronald Cox (born July 23, 1938) is an American actor, singer and songwriter. His best-known roles include Drew Ballinger in Deliverance (1972), George Apple in Apple's Way (1974–75), Ozark Bule in Bound for Glory (1976), Colonel Kerby in Taps (1981), Lieutenant Andrew Bogomil in Beverly Hills Cop (1984) and Beverly Hills Cop II (1987), Dick Jones in RoboCop (1987), Franklin Reed in Family Ties (1986), Vilos Cohaagen in Total Recall (1990), The President in Captain America (1990), Justin in Age of Dinosaurs (2013), Vice President Kinsey in several episodes of Stargate SG-1 and Captain Edward Jellico in two episodes of Star Trek: The Next Generation (1992) as well as in an episode of Star Trek: Prodigy (2022). Cox is also active as a musician, performing over 100 times per year at festivals and theaters each year as of 2012.

Personal life
Cox, the third of five children, was born in the mountain town of Cloudcroft, New Mexico, the son of Lounette (née Rucker) and Bob P. Cox, a carpenter who also worked at a dairy. He grew up in Portales, New Mexico. Cox met his wife Mary when she was in the fifth grade and he was in the seventh grade, and they married in 1960 and have two children. Cox graduated from Eastern New Mexico University in 1963 with a double major in theater and speech correction. Mary died in 2006, 50 years to the day of their first date. Cox often talks about her during his music performances.

Acting career
As an actor, Cox made his debut in the 1972 film Deliverance. In one scene, he plays the instrumental "Dueling Banjos" on his guitar with a banjo-playing mountain boy, played by child actor Billy Redden. He was hired for the role because he could play the guitar. Cox published his autobiography in 2012, recounting his experiences making the film.

In 1974–1975, Cox starred in the short-lived family-oriented series entitled Apple's Way, created by Earl Hamner, creator of The Waltons. He also appeared as Mr. Webb in a television production of Our Town. In 1977, he appeared in the episode "Devil Pack" from the series Quinn Martin's Tales of the Unexpected. In 1984, 12 years after Deliverance, Cox again played a member of a small group of men who are lost, this time in the Nevada desert, and being chased by bloodthirsty locals in the low-budget film Courage. One of Cox's roles was that of Dr. John Gideon during the final season of the television medical drama St. Elsewhere. His character was mooned by Dr. Donald Westphall (Ed Flanders) at the end of the third episode of season six. Cox's first role in a big-budget film came in 1984 as Lt. Andrew Bogomil in Beverly Hills Cop, and he returned to the role in Beverly Hills Cop II in 1987. That same year, Cox appeared in the Paul Verhoeven film RoboCop as corporate arch-villain Dick Jones. In 1986, Cox played the mayor in season 3, episodes 1 and 2, "Death Stalks the Big Top", of the TV series Murder, She Wrote.

In 1990, Cox co-starred as Los Angeles Police Chief Roger Kendrick in the short-lived Cop Rock, presenting a striking physical resemblance to the real-world incumbent Chief Daryl Gates. He also appeared as the antagonistic Mars Administrator Vilos Cohaagen in Total Recall the same year. Cox had a guest role on Star Trek: The Next Generation as Captain Edward Jellico in the two-part episode "Chain of Command". He also played Henry Mason, the father of Bree Van de Kamp (Marcia Cross) on Desperate Housewives. In 1997, Cox portrayed the fictional President of the United States Jack Neil in the movie Murder at 1600. Cox also portrayed John Ramsey in the 2000 TV film Perfect Murder, Perfect Town and Senator/Vice President Robert Kinsey in Stargate SG-1.

Cox had a role in The Starter Wife. He played Pappy McCallister, the husband of Molly Kagan's best friend Joan. He occasionally has done animation work, lending his voice to the Tyrusian deserter Doc in Invasion America and Senator McMillan in Todd McFarlane's Spawn. Cox guest-starred in an episode of Matthew Perry's 2011 series Mr. Sunshine.

Cox played Walter Kenney in Dexter, season six, episode three ("Smokey and the Bandit"). His character was a serial killer known as "The Tooth Fairy", whom Dexter had idolized while growing up. He guest-starred in an episode of Diagnosis Murder entitled "The Pressure to Murder", episode 9, season three. Cox played Gideon Claybourne on season 6 of Nashville in 2018.

Music career
Despite having a successful acting career, Cox said that music now comes first in his life. He turns down about 90% of the acting jobs he is offered to play over 100 shows at festivals and theaters each year. He is accompanied by his band. Cox also leads a musical tour to Ireland each year.

On November 2, 2019, Cox was inducted into the New Mexico Music Hall of Fame.

On July 25, 2021, Cox won the New Mexico Music Awards with the Norman Petty Producers Award going to Tom (Panda) Ryan for his recording of Ronny Cox's Live at the Kitchen Sink featuring the 2021 Best Folk Music Award with his song, "Portales". Live at the Kitchen Sink was recorded at The Kitchen Sink Recording Studio in Santa Fe, New Mexico.

Filmography

 1972 Deliverance as Drew Ballinger
 1972 The Mind Snatchers as Sergeant Boford Miles
 1972 Bonanza, episode "New Man" as Lucas
 1974 A Case of Rape as David Harrod
 1975 Who Is the Black Dahlia? as Sergeant Finis Brown
 1976 Bound for Glory as Ozark Bule
 1977 Quinn Martin's Tales of the Unexpected, episode "Devil Pack" (TV) as Jerry Colby
 1977 The Car as Deputy Luke Johnson
 1977 The Girl Called Hatter Fox (TV) as Dr. Teague Summer
 1978 Gray Lady Down as Commander David Samuelson
 1978 Harper Valley PTA as Willis Newton
 1979 The Onion Field as Sergeant Pierce R. Brooks
 1980 The Courage of Kavik the Wolf Dog as Kurt Evans
 1980 Alcatraz: The Whole Shocking Story (TV) as Bernard Coy
 1981 Taps as Colonel Kerby
 1981 Fallen Angel (TV film) as Frank Dawson
 1982 The Beast Within as Eli MacCleary
 1982 Tangiers as Colonel Powers
 1982 Two of a Kind as Ted Hahn
 1982 Some Kind of Hero as Colonel Powers
 1984 The Jesse Owens Story (TV) as Coach Larry Snyder
 1984 Beverly Hills Cop as Lieutenant Andrew Bogomil
 1984 Raw Courage (also writer and producer) as Pete Canfield
 1984-1985 Spencer as George Winger
 1985 Vision Quest as Louden's Dad
 1985 Tangiers as Bob Steele
 1986 Hollywood Vice Squad as Captain Jensen
 1987 Steele Justice as Bennett
 1987 Beverly Hills Cop II as Captain / Chief Andrew Bogomil
 1987 RoboCop as Dick Jones
 1987-1988 St. Elsewhere as Dr. John Gideon
 1987 Amazon Women on the Moon as General Balentine (segment "The Unknown Soldier") (uncredited)
 1988 In the Line of Duty: The F.B.I. Murders as FBI Special Agent Ben Grogan
 1989 One Man Force as McCoy
 1989 Martians Go Home as The President
 1990 Loose Cannons as Bob Smiley
 1990 Total Recall as Chancellor Vilos Cohaagen
 1990 Captain America as President Tom Kimball
 1990 Cop Rock as Chief Roger Kendrick
 1991 Scissors as Dr. Stephan Carter
 1992 Star Trek: The Next Generation (two episodes) as Captain Edward Jellico
 1992 Perry Mason: The Case of the Heartbroken Bride as Mr. Parrish
 1997 Murder at 1600 as President Jack Neil
 1998-2005 Stargate SG-1 (11 episodes) as Senator Robert Kinsey / Vice President Robert Kinsey
 1998 Puraido: Unmei no Toki as Chief Justice Sir William Webb
 1998 Frog and Wombat as Principal Larry Struble
 1999 Forces of Nature as Hadley
 1999 The Outer Limits, episode "Deja Vu" as Lieutenant Colonel Lester Glade
 1999 Deep Blue Sea as Franklin's Boss (uncredited)
 1999 FreeSpace 2 as Admiral Aken Bosch (voice)
 2000 Perfect Murder, Perfect Town as John Ramsey
 2001 The Agency (2001) as Director Alex Pierce III
 2001 The Boys of Sunset Ridge as Ben Thorpe
 2001 American Outlaws as Doc Mimms, Zee's Dad
 2001 Losing Grace as Dave Reed
 2002 Crazy As Hell as Delazo
 2004 Killzone (Video Game) as Stuart Adams (voice)
 2004 Angel in the Family as Buddy
 2005 The L.A. Riot Spectacular as The Chief
 2006 Desperate Housewives (TV Series) as Henry Mason
 2006 Commander in Chief as Senator Joe Peck
 2007 Tell Me You Love Me as John
 2008 Cold Case as Daniel Patterson '08
 2009 Imagine That as Tom Stevens
 2011 Dexter as Walter Kenney
 2013 Age of Dinosaurs as Justin
 2014 Beyond the Reach as Sheriff Robb
 2018 Nashville as Gideon Claybourne
 2019 The Car: Road to Revenge as The Mechanic
 2021 Being the Ricardos as Older Bob Carroll 
 2022 Star Trek Prodigy as Admiral Edward Jellico (voice)

Discography

Books
 Cox, Ronny. Dueling Banjos: The Deliverance of Drew. Decent Hill, 2012.  (paperback); 9781936085590 (hardcover); 9781936085606 (eBook)

Further reading

 Voisin, Scott Character Kings: Hollywood's Familiar Faces Discuss the Art & Business of Acting. BearManor Media, 2009.

References

External links
 
 
 Ronny Cox Interview NAMM Oral History Library (2017)

1938 births
Living people
Male actors from New Mexico
American male film actors
American male television actors
Eastern New Mexico University alumni
People from Portales, New Mexico
American male singer-songwriters
Guitarists from New Mexico
American male writers
People from Otero County, New Mexico
20th-century American male actors
21st-century American male actors
Songwriters from New Mexico
20th-century American guitarists
American male guitarists
American country singer-songwriters
20th-century American singers
20th-century American male singers
21st-century American guitarists
21st-century American singers
21st-century American male singers